Palaeomystella oligophaga is a moth of the family Agonoxenidae. It is found in Brazil.

The length of the forewings is 7.7-10.1 mm. They have pale-brown scales tipped with brown
intermixed with brown scales, The hindwings are pale gray.

The larvae feed on Macairea radula and Macairea thyrsiflora. They create a prosoplasmatic histioid gall on their host plants. The species may create three different types of soft, fleshy galls. The larvae are pale gray and 5.2-8.7 mm long.

Etymology
The species epithet oligophaga is derived from oligophagous (meaning: feeding only on a small number of host species).

References

Moths described in 2008
Agonoxeninae
Moths of South America